UFC 113: Machida vs. Shogun 2 was a mixed martial arts event held by the Ultimate Fighting Championship on May 8, 2010, at the Bell Centre in Montreal, Quebec, Canada.

Background
UFC 113 featured the rematch between Lyoto Machida and Maurício Rua for the UFC Light Heavyweight Championship. The two first met at UFC 104, where Lyoto Machida retained his belt in a controversial unanimous decision victory.

For the co-main event, a bout between former Light Heavyweight champions Rashad Evans and Quinton Jackson was initially linked to this event, but was subsequently moved to UFC 114 where the pairing served as the headliner.

Tim Credeur was scheduled to face Tom Lawlor, but was forced from the card with an injury and replaced by Joe Doerksen.

Joey Beltran was set to fight Chad Corvin, however after Corvin's paperwork was not approved by the Quebec Athletic Commission, Beltran ended up fighting Tim Hague.

Nick Catone was forced out of his bout with John Salter due to a back injury. UFC veteran David Loiseau was supposed to step in as his replacement, but Loiseau was denied a license to appear on this card due to alleged ties to organized crime. Salter ended up fighting returning UFC fighter Jason MacDonald. Loiseau would still make his return to the UFC having faced Mario Miranda at UFC 115.

According to UFC President Dana White, the winner of the Josh Koscheck-Paul Daley fight would receive a title shot with Georges St-Pierre for the UFC Welterweight Championship and be the opposing coach to St. Pierre in the upcoming twelfth season of the UFC reality TV show, The Ultimate Fighter.

Results

Post event
After the bell sounded to signify the end of the final round, Koscheck walked back to his corner with a visibly upset Paul Daley following. What looked to be a gesture of good sportsmanship turned out to be a sucker punch delivered by Daley which Koscheck blocked. In the post-fight press conference, Koscheck went on to say, "Oh yeah, it hurt. It was the best shot he landed all night."  Dana White stated "He [Daley] will never fight in the UFC again."

Bonus awards
Fighters were awarded $65,000 bonuses.

Fight of the Night: Jeremy Stephens vs. Sam Stout
Knockout of the Night: Maurício Rua
Submission of the Night: Alan Belcher

References

See also
 Ultimate Fighting Championship
 List of UFC champions
 List of UFC events
 2010 in UFC

Ultimate Fighting Championship events
Mixed martial arts in Canada
Sports competitions in Montreal
2010 in mixed martial arts
2010 in Canadian sports
2010 in Quebec